An unpaired word is one that, according to the usual rules of the language, would appear to have a related word but does not. Such words usually have a prefix or suffix that would imply that there is an antonym, with the prefix or suffix being absent or opposite. If the prefix or suffix is negative, such as 'dis-' or -'less', the word can be called an orphaned negative.

Unpaired words can be the result of one of the words falling out of popular usage, or can be created when only one word of a pair is borrowed from another language, in either case yielding an accidental gap, specifically a morphological gap. Other unpaired words were never part of a pair; their starting or ending phonemes, by accident, happen to match those of an existing morpheme, leading to a reinterpretation.

The classification of a word as "unpaired" can be problematic, as a word thought to be unattested might reappear in real-world usage or be created, for example, through humorous back-formation. In some cases a paired word does exist, but is quite rare or archaic (no longer in general use).

Such words – and particularly the back-formations, used as nonce words – find occasional use in wordplay, particularly light verse. There are a handful of notable examples in modern English.

In English

See also
 Accidental gap
 Back-formation
 Cranberry morpheme
 Defective verb – other form of lexical gap
 Eggcorn
 False cognate
 Fossilization (linguistics)
 Polarity item

Notes

References

External links
"Unpaired words" at World Wide Words
"Absent antonyms" at 2Wheels: The Return
Words with no opposite equivalent, posted by James Briggs on April 2, 2003, at The Phrase Finder
Brev Is the Soul of Wit, Ben Schott, The New York Times, April 19, 2010

Examples 
 Parker, J. H. "The Mystery of The Vanished Positive" in Daily Mail, Annual for Boys and Girls, 1953, Ed. French, S. Daily Mail: London pp. 42–43 – article on the topic, ending in a short poem  using humorous opposites of unpaired words
 Jack Winter, "How I Met My Wife", The New Yorker, July 25, 1994, p. 82, uses many unpaired words for humorous effect
 Semantic Enigmas: "I once read a nonsense poem that removed the apparently negative prefixes of words like 'inept', 'inert' and 'uncouth' to make new words: 'ept', 'ert' and 'couth'. I've searched for the poem since, but no luck. Can anyone help?", The Guardian – cites "Gloss" by David McCord and "A Dream of Couth" in The Game of Words by Willard R. Espy

Linguistic morphology